Castilian War may refer to:
 Castilian war of succession (1282–1304) between Sancho IV of Castile and the Infantes de la Cerda
 Castilian Civil War (1351–1369) between Peter of Castile and Henry II of Castile
 War of the Two Peters (1356–1375) between Peter of Castile and Peter IV of Aragon
 War of the Castilian Succession, or Castilian War of Succession (1475–1479) between Isabella I of Castile and Joanna la Beltraneja 
 Revolt of the Comuneros, or Castilian War of the Communities (1520–1) between Castilian Comuneros rebels and Castilian Royalists 
 Castilian War, or Spanish Expedition to Borneo (1578) between the Spanish Empire and the Bruneian Empire